The Federated Mountain Clubs of New Zealand (Inc) (commonly referred to by its acronym, FMC), is a New Zealand environment and conservation NGO.

It is the only national association of over 110 tramping, mountain climbing clubs and schools. Membership, both financial and associated, is currently (Jan 2021) 23,000.  It was founded in 1931 by existing tramping clubs uniting to fight possible threats to New Zealand's mountain and forested areas.  FMC has continued since then to actively:

 promote membership of Clubs as a means of enjoying the outdoors
 advocacy on access issues related to New Zealand's outdoors
 liaise with Government Ministries and NGO's on all matters related to the outdoors

References

External links
 Official website
Archives at Alexander Turnbull Library

Climbing organizations
Hiking organizations
Sports organisations of New Zealand
Mountaineering in New Zealand
Environmental organisations based in New Zealand